Gloucester  is a constituency centred on the cathedral city and county town of the same name, represented in the House of Commons of the UK Parliament by Richard Graham of the Conservative Party.

Constituency profile
The seat covers most of Gloucester and its neighbouring suburbs of Quedgeley and Hucclecote. Residents' incomes and wealth are around average for the UK.

Since 1979 Gloucester has been a bellwether constituency by passing between representatives of the two largest parties in the same way as the government. After nearly three decades as a Conservative seat, it was held by Labour from 1997 to 2010 before returning to a Conservative on a swing of 8.9%.

History 
A borough of Gloucester was established by 1295 that returned two burgesses as Members of Parliament to the House of Commons.  Its population meant this was a situation not leading to an outright rotten borough identified for abolition under the Reform Act 1832 however on more fair (far more equal representation) national changes in 1885, representation was reduced to one member under the Redistribution of Seats Act 1885.

Boundaries 

1918–1950: The County Borough of Gloucester.

1950–1955: The County Borough of Gloucester, and in the Rural District of Gloucester the parishes of Barnwood, Brockworth, Hempsted, Hucclecote, and Wotton Vill.

1955–1974: The County Borough of Gloucester, and in the Rural District of Gloucester the parishes of Barnwood, Brockworth, Hempsted, and Hucclecote.

Wotton Vill parish had been absorbed by Gloucester CB in 1951.  The constituency boundaries remained unchanged.

1974–1983: The County Borough of Gloucester.

1983–1997: The City of Gloucester, and the District of Stroud wards of Quedgeley and Hardwicke, and Upton St Leonards.

1997–2010: The City of Gloucester.

2010–present: The City of Gloucester wards of Abbey, Barnwood, Barton and Tredworth, Elmbridge, Grange, Hucclecote, Kingsholm and Wotton, Matson and Robinswood, Moreland, Podsmead, Quedgeley Fieldcourt, Quedgeley Severn Vale, Tuffley, and Westgate.

Members of Parliament

MPs 1295–1640

MPs 1640–1885 

In 1881, Robinson's willingness to stand down faced with a popular petition and the unwillingness of the Conservatives to make allegations nor investigate matters further led to suspicions of collusion between the parties and a Royal Commission was set up to examine electoral practices. The Royal Commission concluded that Gloucester was among the most corrupt of the seven towns investigated and that bribery was endemic in all elections in the city. The Commission concluded that half of the electorate had taken bribes in 1880 and blamed local politicians for most of the corruption.  Despite these findings and virtually halving the electorate eligible to vote Robinson was reelected for Gloucester in 1885 when representation had been reduced to one member under the Redistribution of Seats Act 1885.

MPs since 1885

Elections

Elections in the 2010s 

Note: The Brexit Party were due to field Richard Ford as a candidate, but the nomination was withdrawn.

Elections in the 2000s 

{{Election box candidate with party link|
  |party      = Green Party of England and Wales
  |candidate  = Bryan Meloy
  |votes      = 857
  |percentage = 1.7
  |change     = 'New}}

 Elections in the 1990s 

 Elections in the 1980s 

 Elections in the 1970s 

 Elections in the 1960s 

 Elections in the 1950s 

 Election in the 1940s 

 Elections in the 1930s 

 Elections in the 1920s 

 Elections in the 1910s 

 Elections in the 1900s 

 Elections in the 1890s 

 Elections in the 1880s 

 

 A petition was raised against the election of Robinson and Monk, leading to Robinson's election being made void. Although the petition against Monk was dismissed, the writ was suspended and Monk became the only MP for the constituency.

Elections in the 1870s

 
 

 

 
 

 Caused by Price's resignation after being appointed a railway commissioner.

Elections in the 1860s

 
 
 

 

 
 
 
 

 Caused by Powell's appointment as Recorder of Wolverhampton.

 
 
 
 

 Caused by the previous election being declared void on petition "by reason of extensive corruption".

Elections in the 1850s

 
  
 
 

 
 
   

 

 

 Caused by Price seeking re-election after resigning to accept a contract for supplying huts to the army in the Crimea.

  
 
 

 Caused by Berkeley's appointment as a Lord Commissioner of the Admiralty.

 
  
 

 

 

Elections in the 1840s

 

Appointment of Berkeley as a Naval Lord of the Admiralty

 
 
   

Elections in the 1830s

Hope seeks re-election after election petition against him had been dismissed.

 
 

 

Appointment of Berkeley as a Naval Lord of the Admiralty

 See also 
 List of parliamentary constituencies in Gloucestershire

Notes

References

 Sources 

  Williams, W. R., Parliamentary History of Co. of Gloucester, Hereford, 1898
 Robert Beatson, A Chronological Register of Both Houses of Parliament (London: Longman, Hurst, Res & Orme, 1807) A Chronological Register of Both Houses of the British Parliament, from the Union in 1708, to the Third Parliament of the United Kingdom of Great Britain and Ireland, in 1807
 D. Brunton & D. H. Pennington, Members of the Long Parliament (London: George Allen & Unwin, 1954)
 Cobbett's Parliamentary history of England, from the Norman Conquest in 1066 to the year 1803 (London: Thomas Hansard, 1808) titles A-Z
 The Constitutional Year Book for 1913 (London: National Union of Conservative and Unionist Associations, 1913)
 F. W. S. Craig, British Parliamentary Election Results 1832–1885 (2nd edition, Aldershot: Parliamentary Research Services, 1989)
 F. W. S. Craig, British Parliamentary Election Results 1918–1949 (Glasgow: Political Reference Publications, 1969)
 F. W. S. Craig, British parliamentary election results 1885–1918 (2 ed.). (Aldershot: Parliamentary Research Services, 1989)
 Maija Jansson (ed.), Proceedings in Parliament, 1614 (House of Commons) (Philadelphia: American Philosophical Society, 1988) Proceedings in Parliament, 1614 (House of Commons)
 Lewis Namier & John Brooke, The History of Parliament: The House of Commons 1754–1790 (London: HMSO, 1964)
 J. E. Neale, The Elizabethan House of Commons (London: Jonathan Cape, 1949)
 J. Holladay Philbin, Parliamentary Representation 1832 – England and Wales (New Haven: Yale University Press, 1965)
 Henry Stooks Smith, The Parliaments of England from 1715 to 1847'' (2nd edition, edited by FWS Craig – Chichester: Parliamentary Reference Publications, 1973)

External links 
 Gloucester CLP website

Parliamentary constituencies in South West England
Politics of Gloucester
Constituencies of the Parliament of the United Kingdom established in 1295